ECIL Bus Station, commonly known as ECIL Bus Stop, is a terminal bus station located in Kamala Nagar, Kushaiguda Secunderabad, Telangana. It was constructed in 2010 and is one of the major bus stations in Hyderabad and Secunderabad.

Services

ECIL Bus Station features two platforms, one for Secunderabad-bound buses and one for all other buses, most of which serve the Hyderabad region. The station serves several thousand people from Kamala Nagar, ECIL, A. S. Rao Nagar, Moula-Ali, Kapra, Neredmet, and Kushaiguda every day.

See also
 Telangana State Road Transport Corporation
 One stop

References

External links 
  TSRTC Official Website
 APSRTC bus station list

Bus stations in Telangana